Oddleif Olavsen (9 October 1945 – 5 June 2022) was a Norwegian politician.

Biography 
A member of the Conservative Party, he served as mayor of Bodø from 1995 to 1999. He then served on the Nordland County Council from 2003 to 2007.

Oddleif Olavsen died on 5 June 2022 at the age of 76.

References 

1945 births
2022 deaths
Norwegian footballers
FK Bodø/Glimt players
Norwegian politicians
Conservative Party (Norway) politicians
Politicians from Bodø